Carlos Alcantara (born 21 August 1948) is a Uruguayan former cyclist. He competed in the individual road race event at the 1976 Summer Olympics.

References

External links
 

1948 births
Living people
Uruguayan male cyclists
Olympic cyclists of Uruguay
Cyclists at the 1976 Summer Olympics
Place of birth missing (living people)